is a 1991 Japanese animated drama film written and directed by Isao Takahata, based on the 1982 manga of the same title by Hotaru Okamoto and Yuko Tone. It was animated by Studio Ghibli for Tokuma Shoten, Nippon Television Network and Hakuhodo, and distributed by Toho. It was released on July 20, 1991. The ending theme song  is a Japanese translation of Amanda McBroom's composition "The Rose".

Only Yesterday explores a genre traditionally thought to be outside the realm of animated subjects: a realistic drama written for adults, particularly women. The film was a surprise box office success, attracting a large adult audience and becoming the highest-grossing Japanese film of 1991 in the country. It has also been well received by critics outside of Japan—it has a 100% rating on Rotten Tomatoes.

To celebrate the film's 25th anniversary, GKIDS released the film for the first time in an English-language format on February 26, 2016, featuring the voices of Daisy Ridley, Dev Patel, Alison Fernandez, Laura Bailey and Ashley Eckstein.

On August 31, 2020, it was announced a live-action special based on the manga would air on NHK's subchannels BS Premium and BS4K in January 2021. The special would be about a 64-year-old Taeko and her daughter and granddaughter.

Plot
In 1982, Taeko Okajima is 27 years old, unmarried, has lived her whole life in Tokyo and now works at a company there. She decides to take another trip to visit the family of her elder sister's in-laws in the rural countryside to help with the safflower harvest and get away from city life. While traveling at night on a sleeper train to Yamagata, she begins to recall memories of herself as a schoolgirl in 1966, and her intense desire to go on holiday like her classmates, all of whom have family outside of the big city.

At the arrival train station, she is surprised to find out that her brother-in-law's second cousin Toshio, whom she barely knows, is the one who came to pick her up. During her stay in Yamagata, she finds herself increasingly nostalgic and wistful for her childhood self, while simultaneously wrestling with adult issues of career and love. The trip dredges up forgotten memories (not all of them good ones)—the first stirrings of childish romance, puberty and growing up, the frustrations of math and boys. In lyrical switches between the present and the past, Taeko wonders if she has been true to the dreams of her childhood self. In doing so, she begins to realize that Toshio has helped her along the way. Finally, Taeko faces her own true self, how she views the world and the people around her. Taeko chooses to stay in the countryside instead of returning to Tokyo. It is implied that she and Toshio begin a relationship.

Cast and characters

Film notes

Studio Ghibli co-founder and the film's producer Hayao Miyazaki was intrigued by the original Only Yesterday manga, believing there was potential value in depicting the type of children's story it told. However, he felt he was not up to the task of adapting it into a film, but the idea remained in his mind as he directed other children's films such as My Neighbor Totoro, and he eventually brought the idea to Takahata.

The story takes place within the Takase district of Yamagata City, Yamagata Prefecture. The Takase Station (and also Yamadera Station) of the JNR (currently JR East) Senzan Line is featured prominently; though it has since been rebuilt, the scenery remains mostly unchanged. During the course of the film, characters visit prominent locales, including the resort destination of Mount Zaō.

Unlike the typical Japanese character animation style, the characters have more realistic facial muscles and expressions due to the dialogue being recorded first (the tradition in Japan is to record it after the animation is completed) and the animators fit the animation to the spoken dialogue. Takahata also had voice actors record some of their lines together, using footage of their performances as a guide for both design and the animation. However, the scenes of Taeko's childhood past were animated before the voices were recorded, giving a subtle contrast between the anime style of her childhood and the adult "reality" of the framing story.

Those scenes set in 1966 with the 10-year-old Taeko are taken from the source material. Takahata had difficulty adapting the episodic manga into a feature film, and he, therefore, invented the framing narrative wherein the adult Taeko journeys to the countryside and falls in love with Toshio.

There is a repeated Eastern European theme in the film, particularly in the soundtrack reflecting the peasant lifestyle still present in the area and the parallels this draws with Japanese rural life. Folk songs from the area repeatedly occur in the film. For example, "Frunzuliță Lemn Adus Cântec De Nuntă" (Fluttering Green Leaves Wedding Song) is a Romanian folk song written by Gheorghe Zamfir and occurs in the film repeatedly during the landscape shots, for example arriving at the farm. Instruments used include the prominent nai played by Zamfir himself, cimbalom and violins. There is also Hungarian music in the film, using pieces of music such as Brahms' "Hungarian Dance No. 5" in a scene where Taeko is eating lunch, and making references to Hungarian musicians when she is in the car with Toshio ("Teremtés" performed by Sebestyén Márta & Muzsikás. Adaptation from a Hungarian traditional folk song). The music of Márta Sebestyén with Muzsikás is used in several scenes as well. Bulgarian folklore music is also used in the soundtrack. When Taeko is on the field, one can first hear Dilmano, Dilbero, followed by Malka Moma Dvori Mete. These are typical Bulgarian folklore songs and the lyrics of both are connected to topics mentioned in the film – the life of farmers and marriage.

Taeko recalls her childhood favorite puppet show  which was an actual puppet show that aired every weekday on NHK from 1964 to 1969.

Release
 Japan – Released on July 20, 1991, by Toho in theaters and December 5, 2012, by Walt Disney Studios Japan on Blu-ray
 Germany – Released on June 6, 2006, under the title of Tränen der Erinnerung (Tears of Memory) – Only Yesterday (Universum Film GmbH)
 Australia – Released on October 11, 2006 (Madman Entertainment)
 United Kingdom – Released on September 4, 2006 (Optimum Releasing/StudioCanal, English re-release)
 North America – Released on January 1, 2016, in New York City and nationwide in the United States on February 26, 2016 (GKIDS)
 Before these dates, the film was the only theatrical Studio Ghibli feature not yet released on home video in the United States or Canada, although a subtitled version of the film was aired on Turner Classic Movies in January 2006, as part of the channel's month-long salute to Miyazaki and Ghibli. GKIDS announced in 2015 that it would release the film in theaters in North America in 2016 along with an English dub, with actors Daisy Ridley, Dev Patel, Ashley Eckstein and Alison Fernandez confirmed to lend their voices.
 The English version of the film was released on Blu-ray and DVD in the US on July 5, 2016 (GKIDS/Universal Pictures Home Entertainment), earning $1,780,357 in sales revenue.

Reception

Box office
Only Yesterday was the highest-grossing Japanese film on the domestic market in 1991, grossing  at the Japanese box office. The 2016 English-language release later earned $525,958, including $453,243 in the United States.

Critical reception
The film received widespread critical acclaim. On Rotten Tomatoes, the film has a rating of 100%, based on 56 reviews, with an average rating of 8.39/10. The critical consensus states "Only Yesterdays long-delayed U.S. debut fills a frustrating gap for American Ghibli fans while offering further proof of the studio's incredibly consistent commitment to quality." It has a score 90 out of 100 on Metacritic, based on 19 reviews, indicating "universal acclaim".

Nicolas Rapold, of The New York Times, gave the film a positive review, saying, "Mr. Takahata's psychologically acute film, which was based on a manga, seems to grow in impact, too, as the adult Taeko comes to a richer understanding of what she wants and how she wants to live." Glenn Kenny of RogerEbert.com awarded it a similarly positive review, saying "Like Kaguya, it functions as a highly sensitive and empathetic consideration of the situation of women in Japanese society—but it's also a breathtaking work of art on its own."

See also
 Whisper of the Heart and From Up on Poppy Hill, 1995 and 2011 Japanese animated drama films with similar stories, also from Studio Ghibli.
 Ocean Waves, a 1993 Japanese animated TV film, also from Studio Ghibli.
 Japan, Our Homeland
 Mai Mai Miracle

Notes

References

External links
 Only Yesterday – TCM Overview and release request.
 
 
 
 
 Only Yesterday// Nausicaa.net – a richly detailed fan site with reviews, commentary, and links to scripts and song lyrics

1990s Japanese-language films
1991 anime films
1991 films
1991 romantic drama films
Animated coming-of-age films
Animated drama films
Animated romance films
Anime films based on manga
Drama anime and manga
Films directed by Isao Takahata
Films set in 1966
Films set in 1982
Films set in Japan
Films set in Tokyo
Films set in Yamagata Prefecture
Japanese adult animated films
Japanese romantic drama films
Romance anime and manga
Studio Ghibli animated films
Toho animated films